Club Social Cultural Deportivo El Inca (sometimes referred as El Inca) is a Peruvian football club, playing in the city of Chao, Virú, La Libertad, Peru.

History
The Club Social Cultural Deportivo El Inca was founded on January 1, 1973. 

In 2016 Copa Perú, the club classified to the Departamental Stage, but was eliminated when finished in 3rd place.

In 2017 Copa Perú, the club classified to the National Stage, but was eliminated when finished in 38th place.

In 2018 Copa Perú, the club classified to the National Stage, but was eliminated when finished in 30th place.

In 2019 Copa Perú, the club classified to the Departamental Stage, but was eliminated by Atlético Verdún in the Second Stage.

Honours

Regional
Liga Departamental de La Libertad:
Winners (1): 2017
Runner-up (1): 2018

Liga Provincial de Virú:
Winners (10): 2007, 2008, 2009, 2011, 2012, 2014, 2016, 2017, 2018, 2019

Liga Distrital de Chao:
Winners (13): 2007, 2008, 2009, 2011, 2012, 2013, 2014, 2015, 2016, 2017, 2018, 2019, 2022

See also
List of football clubs in Peru
Peruvian football league system

References

Football clubs in Peru
Association football clubs established in 1973
1973 establishments in Peru